Richard Prokas (born 22 January 1976) is an English retired professional footballer who played as a midfielder for Cambridge United and Carlisle United in the Football League. He appeared in the famous Jimmy Glass game for Carlisle, in which the goalkeeper scored in the 94th minute to keep Carlisle United in the Football League. Prokas also gained notoriety in a third round FA Cup tie with Premier League club Arsenal in January 2001. Prokas carried out a two footed horror tackle on captain Patrick Vieira which split the Frenchman's shin pad. However Prokas escaped any punishment for the tackle.

References

Sources

External links

1976 births
Living people
People from Penrith, Cumbria
English footballers
Association football midfielders
Carlisle United F.C. players
Cambridge United F.C. players
Workington A.F.C. players
Gretna F.C. players
English Football League players
Penrith F.C. managers
English football managers
Stalybridge Celtic F.C. players
Footballers from Cumbria